Songs from How to Succeed in Business Without Really Trying is the first EP by Nick Jonas, released on May 8, 2012. The EP contains 5 songs which are available as a digital download on iTunes. The 5 songs on the EP are tunes that Nick performs on stage during the Broadway musical, How to Succeed in Business Without Really Trying.

Background and development

On February 19, 2012 Nick recorded 5 songs ("How to Succeed," "I Believe in You," and "Brotherhood of Man." In addition, he will be joined by Rob Bartlett for "The Company Way," by Rob Bartlett & Ellen Harvey for "Brotherhood of Man", and by Rose Hemingway for "Rosemary.") for the How To Succeed In Business soundtrack.
The album is produced by six-time Grammy nominee Robert Sher, who also produced the revival’s How to Succeed cast album. On February 27 it was announced that the EP will be released during the Spring. As of April 17, the EP was available for pre-order and also on that same day the track list was revealed. It was announced on April 19 that the EP will be released on May 8, 2012. On April 30, 2012 the song "I Believe in You" was released online.

Reception
Ian Gude said about the EP: The last thing I expected to enjoy was an EP of songs from How To Succeed in Business Without Really Trying, featuring the current lead on Broadway, Nick Jonas from another 'bubble gum pop' band, The Jonas Brothers. But enjoy it I did. Judging by this EP by Broadway Records, he should pop by more often. The EP is too short (5 tracks) - oh how I would have loved to have heard more. Jonas is totally at home with the style, melodies and lyrics of the piece, and is certainly one to watch in future Broadway productions. It would be great to hear him do a Broadway album, or songs from the Great American Songbook, as he clearly has the voice, and the intelligence, to give them the treatments they deserve. The CD design and production is top notch, and puts many full recordings to shame. It's clear a lot of thought has gone into this release and its design, and Broadway Records should be pleased with the final product. I know I was.

Promotion
On January 26, 2012 Nick stopped by Live! with Kelly to talk about his role as J Pierrepont Finch in How To Succeed In Business Without Really Trying. He also sang the song "I Believe In You". On February 14 he performed the song live for the soundcheck live chat show.
Nick Jonas stopped by Late Night with Jimmy Fallon on February 20 to perform on the first night of Fallon's annual Broadway Week. He closed the show by singing a jazzy rendition of “I Believe in You,” a signature song from the classic Frank Loesser musical. On April 1, 2012 Nick performed songs from the musical with the musical cast & the New York City Mayor Michael Bloomberg.
He performed the song "I Believe In You" again during the 2012 Broadway Beacon Awards on June 4, 2012.

Track listing

Personnel
Credits for Songs From How To Succeed In Business Without Really Trying extended play:

Musicians
 Nick Jonas – lead vocals
 Rob Bartlett – guest vocals
 Rose Hemingway – guest vocals
 Ellen Harvey – guest vocals
 Anderson Cooper – narrator

Production

 Robert Sher – producer, mixer
 Ken Mahoney – executive producer
 Adam Long – chief recording engineer, mixer
 Kevin Reeves – mastering
 Matt Barnaba – assistant
 Ben Cook – assistant
 Ginno Murphy – assistant
 Joseph Weiss – coordinator
 David Chase – supervising producer
 Doug Besterman – supervising producer, orchestrator
 Jon Weston – supervising producer
 Van Dean – design, executive producer
 Ari Mintz – photography
 Chris Callis – photography
 Kenny Howard – executive producer
 Johnny Lindamood – assistant recording Engineer
 Darren Moore – assistant recording Engineer
 Halsey Quemere – assistant Recording engineer
 Sheldon Yellowhair – assistant recording engineer
 Joel Scheuneman – chief technical advisor
 OBie O'Brien – audio director, video producer
 David Chase – arrangements, conductor, music director
 Matt Perri – associate conductor
 Howard Joines – music coordinator
 Frank Loesser – songwriter

Charts

Release history

References

2012 EPs
Nick Jonas albums
Cast recordings